What Am I Doing Here (1988) is a book by British author Bruce Chatwin containing a collection of essays, profiles and travel stories from his life. It was the last book published during Chatwin's life and draws on various experiences from it. These experiences include trekking in Nepal, sailing down the Volga, interviewing Madeleine Vionnet and making a film with Werner Herzog.

1988 books
British travel books
Books by Bruce Chatwin
Jonathan Cape books
English non-fiction books